Sacro Cuore di Gesù (Italian: Sacred Heart of Jesus) is a minor basilica in Grosseto, Tuscany, Italy.

The church was commissioned by the bishop of Grosseto , who intended to pay homage to the fallen in the 1943 Grosseto bombing. On 26 April 1943, the day of Easter Monday, the city was bombed by the Americans, who concentrated on targeting civilians. 134 civilians died that day, especially children who were playing in a funfair set up outside the city walls.

The building was designed by engineer Ernesto Ganelli. Construction began in 1954 and was completed in four years. On 26 April 1958, anniversary of the bombing, bishop Paolo Galeazzi consecrated the church, which was elevated to minor basilica by pope Pius XII on 6 June.

Sacro Cuore di Gesù is decorated with bronze sculptures by artist Tolomeo Faccendi. The decorations include the fourteen stations of the Cross (1954–55) in the nave-aisles, the four Evangelists (1957) on the main facade, the Christ the Redeemer (1958) on the top of the dome, and the Pietà (1960) inside the crypt. The crypt is also decorated with the names of those who died in all World War II bombings in Grosseto; bishop Galeazzi, who died in 1971, has been buried into the crypt.

References

External links

20th-century Roman Catholic church buildings in Italy
Sacro Cuore
Buildings and structures completed in 1958
Churches completed in 1958
Roman Catholic churches in Grosseto